St Germanus Church may refer to:

Churches in England
St Germanus' Church, Faulkbourne, Essex
St Germanus' Church, Rame, Cornwall